Álvaro Adriano Teixeira Pacheco (born 25 June 1971) is a Portuguese professional football manager and former player.

After achieving a total of 70 games in the second tier as a player, he worked as an assistant manager to Miguel Leal before managing in his own right at Fafe. Hired at Vizela in 2019, he achieved consecutive promotions to the Primeira Liga in his first two seasons.

Playing career
Born in Vila Cova da Lixa, Felgueiras, Pacheco is a product of the football academies of his local clubs Lixa and F.C. Felgueiras, while working as a locksmith with his father as a teenager. He started playing professional football with Felgueiras, having played 70 games in the second tier, and had spent most of his career in semi-pro leagues in Portugal. His first job as a manager was in 2005 with the youth ranks of his club Paredes, and he retired from playing in 2007, at the age of 34.

Coaching career

Early years
Pacheco began his senior coaching career with Lixa in 2011. Afterwards, he was the assistant manager for Miguel Leal at Penafiel, Moreirense and Boavista, and with Filipe Ribeiro at Jonava in Lithuania.

On 24 September 2018, Pacheco returned to work as a head coach at Fafe, ranked 7th in the third tier. In his one season there, he took the team to the playoffs, where they were eliminated by Praiense in the quarter-finals.

Vizela
In June 2019, Pacheco signed for Vizela, another team eliminated from the same stage of the play-offs. His first season was aborted because of the COVID-19 pandemic, and the Portuguese Football Federation promoted leaders Vizela and Arouca to the second tier.

On his debut as a professional manager on 12 September 2020, Pacheco won 2–1 at home to U.D. Oliveirense. His team sealed a second successive promotion the following 22 May, beating Arouca to second place with a 5–2 home win over Vilafranquense on the final day; Vizela's only previous season in the Primeira Liga was 1984–85. In July 2021, he was named Manager of the Year at the LPFP Awards and signed a contract for two more years.

In his first top-flight game on 6 August 2021, Pacheco's Vizela lost 3–0 at reigning champions Sporting CP. On 23 December, his side won 1–0 at home in the fifth round of the Taça de Portugal against district neighbours and cup holders Braga. The team were eliminated 3–1 at home by Porto in the quarter-finals on 12 January 2022.

On 30 November 2022, with Vizela in a safe 13th place and the season paused due to the 2022 FIFA World Cup, Pacheco was nonetheless dismissed and replaced by under-23 manager Tulipa. Days later, he was honoured by Vizela City Hall, and said that he wanted to return to the club.

Managerial statistics

Honours
Liga Portugal 2 Coach of the Season: 2020-21

References

External links
 
 Soccerway manager profile

1971 births
Living people
People from Felgueiras
Sportspeople from Porto District
Portuguese footballers
Liga Portugal 2 players
Segunda Divisão players
Campeonato de Portugal (league) players
Association football forwards
F.C. Felgueiras 1932 players
C.D. Aves players
G.D. Estoril Praia players
S.C. Dragões Sandinenses players
AD Fafe players
U.S.C. Paredes players
Portuguese football managers
Primeira Liga managers
F.C. Vizela managers
Portuguese expatriate sportspeople in Lithuania